Charles Penrose (born Charles Penrose Dunbar Cawse; 11 November 1873 – 17 November 1952) was an English music hall and theatre performer, and later radio comedian, who is best known for his unusual comic song "The Laughing Policeman". He was born in Biggleswade, Bedfordshire, the son of a master watchmaker and jeweller.

Early life
He initially followed his father into the jewellery trade, but enjoyed such success with his innovative laughing songs at local concert parties that he was invited to join a theatrical tour at the age of 18. His theatrical career took off, and he appeared in music hall and the West End. One of his most successful performances was in Tonight's the Night at the Gaiety Theatre, London in 1914–15. Penrose married architect's daughter Harriet Lewcock in 1899.

Performing career
It was his second wife, songwriter Mabel Anderson, 26 years younger than he was, who became his most important collaborator. In 1922, Penrose made the first recording of his song "The Laughing Policeman" under the pseudonym 'Charles Jolly'. The composition of the song is officially credited to his wife Mabel under the pseudonym 'Billie Grey', but the music, melody, and laughing are taken from "The Laughing Song" by the American George W. Johnson which was first recorded in 1891. The Penroses wrote numerous other laughing songs including "The Laughing Major", "Curate", "Steeplechaser", "Typist", "Lover" and "Sneezing Man". The B-side of The Laughing Sneezing Man was a short comical sketch called "The Dog Vs The Cornet" where a little boy had to get his dog to out-sing a cornet player and make him stop playing.

Radio
Penrose was one of the first comedians to star on BBC Radio, his most popular role being Sgt. Bob Evergreen in the wartime radio series The Pig and Whistle. He was also a character actor in a number of films in the 1930s and 1940s.

Death
Charles Penrose died of heart disease on 17 November 1952 at the Princess Beatrice Hospital, Kensington, aged 79.

Filmography
 Honeymoon for Three (1935) as Laughing passenger
 The Crimes of Stephen Hawke (1936) as Sir Franklin  
 Calling the Tune (1936) Cameo appearance
 Dreams Come True (1936) (uncredited) 
 Boys Will Be Girls (1937) as Laughing Man in club (uncredited) 
 The Derelict (1937) as Toby's Pal 
 Save a Little Sunshine (1938) as Agent (uncredited) 
 The Dark Eyes of London (1939) as Morrison, undercover detective (uncredited)
 The Man with the Magnetic Eyes (1945) as Roberts 
 Miranda (1948) as Stage Manager (uncredited)

References

External links
 Biggleswade History Society
 

1873 births
1952 deaths
English radio personalities
English male comedians
People from Biggleswade
English male singers
20th-century English comedians